Kud puklo da puklo (Whichever Way the Ball Bounces) (2014) is a Croatian comedy telenovela produced by Nova TV. It is an original story starring Mirna Medaković, Momčilo Otašević, and Ivan Herceg. It is also broadcast in Bosnia-Herzegovina, Serbia, and Slovenia. The first season was aired from September 15, 2014 to June 7, 2015. The second season began airing on September 7, 2015 and ended on June 9, 2016. The cast also includes Luka Peroš best known for his role of Marseille in Money Heist. The series was adapted in Greece with the name Χαιρέτα μου τον Πλάτανο (Hereta mou to Platano) which means Greet the plan tree. This series started in october of 2020 in the state channel ERT. It will have 174 episodes on the first season and there will be second season possibly in fall of 2021.

Plot 

Kud puklo da puklo takes place in Oštrovac, a village at the edge of the national park. The story follows Damir (Momčilo Otašević), a national park ranger, and Katarina (Mirna Medaković), a doctor, who move to Oštrovac as directed by Katarina's grandfather's will. Đuro (Mate Gulin), Katarina's grandfather, lived most of his life as a recluse but left a small fortune to his grandchildren Katarina, Tomislav (Miran Kurspahić), and Krešo (Janko Popović Volarić) provided they spend a year in his dilapidated house in Oštrovac. If they did not, the money would go to the village.

Since the village on the edge of collapse, this money could mean its salvation. Therefore, the village will, at least initially, to do everything to drive Đuro's grandchildren out and get the fortune. Damir's father Mile (Milan Štrljić) heads the local committee, but his adversary, Sveto (Žarko Radić), is doing everything to obtain his position. Many townspeople including a teacher, Barbara (Ecija Ojdanić); a priest, Mirko (Ivan Herceg); Mile's best friend, Stipe (Miodrag Krivokapić); and local tavern owner, Ane (Barbara Vicković), are also on the committee. Each of them, except the priest, agrees it would be a good idea to surreptitiously force Đuro's grandchildren of the village.

Since money is on the line, Đuro's grandchildren have to contend with the villagers regularly. Certain conditions in the home, such as no electricity or running water, also serve to make them more uncomfortable.

Damir quickly develops feelings for Katarina putting him at odds with the rest of the village. Katarina soon starts to feel something for Damir, but resists. In addition to external obstacles between them, Damir and Katarina have great personal differences too. Damir is very conservative and has ideas about where a woman's place is while Katarina has an emancipated and strong personality like her grandfather Đuro.

At the end of the first season, the grandchildren won inheritance and chose to save the village from foreclosure investing in the construction of the hotel "Đuro's Dream" on rural land where a strange man dies through a series of comic events.

Dario (Vladimir Posavec Tušek), the man's accountant, comes looking for him and the diamonds he supposedly left behind. Dario has no choice but to settle with his family at Oštrovac to search the treasure. After failed attempts discover the diamonds, Dario decides to disguise himself as a farmer. Over time, he is quite successful. He eventually brings his daughters Tina (Monika Mihajlović) and Sara (Katja Rožmarić) and searches less for the diamonds. Unsatisfied that her husband had given up the search for the treasure, Miranda (Jelena Perčin) leaves Dario. Miranda eventually returns determined to find the diamonds herself.

Cast and characters

End
The series ended after two seasons and its last episode was aired on June 9, 2016.

Episodes
List of "Kud puklo da puklo" episodes

References

2010s Croatian television series
2014 Croatian television series debuts
2016 Croatian television series endings
Croatian comedy television series
Nova TV (Croatia) original programming